The Mozilla application framework is a collection of cross-platform software components that make up the Mozilla applications. It was originally known as XPFE, an abbreviation of cross-platform front end. It was also known as XPToolkit. To avoid confusion, it is now referred to as the Mozilla application framework.

While similar to generic cross-platform application frameworks like GTK+, Qt and wxWidgets, the intent is to provide a subset of cross-platform functionality suitable for building network applications like web browsers, leveraging the cross-platform functionality already built into the Gecko layout engine.

The following are the various components of the framework:

 Gecko  Gecko is a standard-based layout engine designed for performance and portability.
 Necko  Necko provides an extensible API for several layers of networking from transport to presentation layers.
 XUL  XUL is the basis of user interface. It is an application of XML that defines various user interfaces elements, mostly widgets, control elements, template, etc. It is similar in many ways to HTML.
 XBL  XBL allows one to define their own widget for use in XUL.
 XPCOM  XPCOM is an object interface that allows interfacing between any programming language for which a binding has been developed
 XPConnect  XPConnect is the binding between XPCOM and JavaScript.
 XPInstall  XPInstall is a technology for installing small packages like extensions and themes into Mozilla applications in form of installation archives known as XPI.
 Web services  Mozilla includes built-in support for popular web services standards XML-RPC, SOAP (dropped since Gran Paradiso Alpha 7), and WSDL as well as a simple XMLHttpRequest object similar to the one in Internet Explorer.
 Others  The framework supports a number of open or common standards, including DTD, RDF, XSLT/XPath, MathML, SVG, JavaScript, SQL, LDAP, etc.

Applications that use the framework

Netscape Navigator 9 web browser
Mozilla Firefox web browser
Flock web browser
Wine compatibility layer (Gecko is used in the built-in web browser component)
SeaMonkey Internet suite
Mozilla Thunderbird email client
ChatZilla IRC client
KompoZer WYSIWYG web authoring
Mozilla Sunbird calendar
Komodo IDE and Komodo Edit since version 5 of both
Songbird media player
Former Joost IPTV client
Celtx screenplay writing application
Miro internet TV application
Boxee media center software
Instantbird instant messaging client

See also
XULRunner
Chromium Embedded Framework (CEF)

References

 Syd Logan: Cross-Platform Development in C++: Building Mac OS X, Linux, and Windows Applications, Addison-Wesley, 2007.

External links
The Mozilla Application Framework in Detail
Mozilla as Platform
Rapid Application Development with Mozilla - a book by Nigel McFarlane, published by Prentice Hall, part of the Bruce Perens' Open Source Series (freely downloadable in PDF format)
MozDev.org: Site for projects based on the Mozilla Application Framework; not affiliated with Mozilla Corp. or the Mozilla Foundation

Application programming interfaces
Mozilla
Software that uses XUL